Poshtove is a village in Berdychiv Raion of Zhytomyr Oblast in Ukraine.

Poshtove was previously located in Chudniv Raion until it was abolished on 18 July 2020 as part of the administrative reform of Ukraine, which reduced the number of raions of Zhytomyr Oblast to four.

References

Villages in Berdychiv Raion